{{Infobox Former Country
| conventional_long_name = Raj Darbhanga
| common_name            = 
| country                = 
| era                    = Medieval India
| status                 = 
| event_start            = 
| year_start             = 1557 CE<ref>{{cite web|url=https://www.outlookindia.com/newsscroll/amp/raj-darbhanga--home-of-indias-wealthiest-zamindars-column/1660682|title=Raj Darbhanga - home of Indias wealthiest Zamindars (Column)|website=Outlook India|access-date=8 October 2021}}</ref>
| date_start             = 
| event1                 = 
| date_event1            = 
| event_end              = 
| year_end               = 1947 CE
| date_end               = 
| p1                     = Oiniwar dynasty
| flag_p1                = 
| p2                     = 
| flag_p2                = 
| p3                     = 
| s1                     = Republic of India
| s2                     = 
| flag_s2                = 
| image_flag             = 
| flag_type              = 
| image_coat             = Darbhanga royal insignia.jpg
| coa_size               = 220px
| symbol_type            = Crest
| image_map              = 
| map_width              = 
| image_map_caption      = 
| capital                = Darbhanga
| common_languages       = Maithili, Sanskrit
| religion               = Hinduism
| government_type        = *Tributary to the Mughal Empire (1557 - 1684 AD)

Independent state (1684 - 1804 AD)

Zamindari estate under the British Raj (1804 - 1947 AD)
| leader1                = Raja Mahesh Thakur (first)
| year_leader1           = 
| leader2                = 
| year_leader2           = 
| leader3                = 
| year_leader3           = 
| leader4                = 
| year_leader4           = 
| leader5                = 
| year_leader5           = 
| leader6                = 
| year_leader6           = 
| leader7                = 
| year_leader7           = 
| leader8                = 
| leader9                = 
| leader10               = 
| title_leader           = Maharaja (King)
| legislature            = 
| today                  = India and Nepal
}}

The Darbhanga Raj, also known as Raj Darbhanga and the Khandwala dynasty, was a Maithil Brahmin dynasty and the rulers of territories, not all contiguous, that were part of the Mithila region, now divided between India and Nepal.

The rulers of Raj Darbhanga were Maithil Brahmins and their seat in the town of Darbhanga became the core of the Mithila region as the rulers were patrons of Maithil culture and the Maithili language.

At its peak, the dynasty encompassed over 4000 square miles and is described as the "largest and richest of the North Bihar zamindaris and one of the greatest zamindaris of British India". Despite not being recognised as a princely state by the British, Raj Darbhanga was larger and held more magisterial powers then many princely states, particularly those in Western India. 

History

The Khandaval dynasty were Maithil Brahmins who came into prominence in the time of the Mughal emperor Akbar until the 1960s. The extent of their lands, which were not contiguous, varied over time, and by the British era, their area of ownership was smaller than the area that they were granted under earlier sanad arrangements. A particularly significant reduction occurred when the influence of the British Raj caused them to lose control of the territories that were in Nepal but, nonetheless, their holdings were considerable.

Formation
The area that now comprises the northern part of the Indian state of Bihar was under a state of lawlessness at the end of the Tughlaq Dynasty. Tughlaq had attacked and taken control of Bihar and from the end of the Tughlaq Dynasty until the establishment of the Mughal Empire in 1526 there was anarchy and chaos in the region with various Rajput clans fighting for power. The Mughal emperor Akbar realized that taxes from Mithila could only be collected if there was a king who could ensure peace there and by 1574, he had succeeded in defeating the Rajput Rajas of Tirhut.

As per local tradition, Akbar summoned Rajpandit Chandrapati Thakur to Delhi and asked him to name one of his sons who could be made caretaker and tax collector for his lands in Mithila. Chandrapati Thakur named his middle son, Mahesh Thakur, and Akbar declared Mahesh Thakur as the ruler of Mithila on the day of Ram Navami in 1557 AD after being impressed with his "great erudition". Henningham was of the opinion that Akbar made use of Mahesh Thakur by helping the Maithil Brahmins to displace the Rajputs as the local ruling elite.

In 1684, Aurangzeb issued a firman that had the effect of differentiating Raj Darbhanga from other estates of the region. The lands belonging to the Darbhanga family were theirs permanently and became private property rather than belonging to the Empire. Raj Darbhanga from this point onwards was legally independent and no longer had to pay tribute to the Empire of the Nawabs of Bengal. In a report to the Patna Committee of review, Shitab Rai, the naib diwan of Bihar, admitted that the weak state of the empire had rendered many of the zamindars, including Raj Darbhanga, independent. Henningham described the Raj Darbhanga as a "semi-independent chieftainship".

Consolidation
The rulers of Darbganga in keeping with their elevated status, adopted the Kshatriya surname of Singh and also made use of force when it came to pursuing their interests. They defended their domains against raiders from Nepal and fought battles against local Rajput Rajas. 
The Raj Darbhanga also made the Senas of Makwanpur in Nepal their subordinates with the Sena's having to pay tribute to the Rajas of Darbhanga.

The Raj Darbhanga used its military to help the Nawabs of Bengal in suppressing rebellions from Bettiah, the chieftains of the Terai and Banjaras although the Rajas of Darbhanga themselves still refused to pay taxes or tribute to the Nawabs. In 1750, Alivardi Khan of Bengal sent a force against Narendra Singh of Darbhanga following his refusal to remit revenue however this force was defeated.

The descendants of Mahesh Thakur gradually consolidated their power in social, agrarian, and political matters and came to be regarded as kings of Madhubani. Darbhanga became the seat of power of the Raj Darbhanga family in 1762. They also had a palace at Rajnagar Bihar situated in Madhubani district. They bought land from local people. They became known as a Khandavala family (the richest landlord).

British period

For a period of twenty years (1860–1880), Darbhanga Raj was placed under the Court of Wards by the British Raj. During this period, Darbhanga Raj was involved in litigation regarding succession. This litigation decided that the estate was impartible and succession was to be governed by primogeniture. Zamindari estates in the region, including Darbhanga, actually sought intervention from the Court of Wards from time to time because the stewardship of the British authorities, who invested funds wisely, had a tendency to boost their economic position. The estate had in any event been badly run prior to this time: a complex system influenced by both nepotism and sycophancy had dramatically affected the family's rental income. The bureaucratic system introduced by the Court, whose appointed officials had no ties to the area, resolved the issue although, being focussed entirely on what was best for the owners, it did so without considering the consequences for the tenants.

Towards the end of the 19th century, 47 percent of the cropped area of the Darbhanga estate was used for the cultivation of rice. Three percent of total cultivation was given over to indigo at that time, making the estate one of the most important centres in the region for this crop prior to the introduction of chemical dyes.

Demise
After the independence of India from British rule in 1947, the Government of India initiated several land reform actions and the Zamindari system was abolished. The fortunes of Darbhanga Raj dwindled.

The last ruler of Raj Darbhanga was Maharaja Bahadur Sir Kameshwar Singh. He died in 1962 without naming a successor.

Controversy
The origin of the royal family of Darbhanga is traced to a grant of the Sarkar of Tirhut to Mahesh Thakur by Akbar. The supporters of the theory that Raj Darbhanga was a kingdom argue that it was held by privy council, that the rulership was a hereditary one with succession governed by primogeniture. The supporters argue that by the end of the 18th century, the Sarkar of Tirhut was practically an independent kingdom until the conquest of Bengal and Bihar by the British. The Raj Darbhanga was also much larger when compared with many of the princely states in Western parts of India, many of whom only contained a population of 200 people. These princely states also lacked the magesterial powers that Raj Darbhanga had. It’s annual income of approximately 4 million rupees was also on par with many a princely state.

The opponents of the theory argue that Raj Darbhanga was never a kingdom but rather a zamindari with all the trappings of princely state. The rulers of Raj Darbhanga were the largest landowners in India, and thus were called Raja, and later Maharaja and Maharajadhiraja. They were given the status of ruling prince.

According to Arvind, they were "robber barons", who curried favour from the British and kept trying to be accorded gun salutes and other privileges but it never materialized.

Rulers
  Raja Mahesh Thakur (died 1558).
  Raja Gopal Thakur.  He was the eldest son of Mahesh Thakur. He was king for a short time only as he died suddenly.
  Raja Parmanand Thakur.  He was the second son of Mahesh Thakur. He ruled for a brief period before abdicating in favour of his younger brother Raja Subhankar Singh
  Raja Subhankar Thakur (died 1607). He was the fifth son of Mahesh Thakur.
  Raja Purushottam Thakur (ruled 1607 to 1623). He was the son of Raja Shubhankar Thakur. He was killed in 1623.

  Raja Narayan Thakur (ruled 1623 to 1642).
  Raja Sundar Thakur (ruled 1642 to 1662) (died 1662).
  Raja Mahinath Thakur (ruled 1662 to 1684) (died 1684).
  Raja Nirpat Thakur (ruled 1684 to 1700) (died 1700).
  Raja Raghu Singh (ruled 1700 to 1736) (died 1736). He obtained a lease for the whole of Sarkar Tirhut including Darbhanga and Muzaffarpur at an annual rent of Rs. 100,000, which was a huge amount at that time. The annual revenue of Sarkar Tirhut in 1685 was Rs. . During his reign, Nawab Mahabat Jung, the Nawab Subahdar of Behar, was jealous of his wealth and imprisoned his family at Patna. Raghu Singh escaped capture and succeeded in getting the estate back along with a large grant from the Mughal Governor on the condition that he "do justice, relieve distress, and put the country in flourishing condition." This condition was fulfilled by Raja Raghu Singh and subsequent Maharajas of Darbhanga. He built a mud fort at Bhawara near Madhubani.
  Raja Bishnu Singh (ruled 1736 to 1740) (died 1740).
  Raja Narendra Singh (ruled 1740 to 1760) (died 1760). He died without issue but adopted Pratap Singh, great-great-grandson of Narayan Thakur, as his successor.
  Raja Pratap Singh (ruled 1760 to 1776) (died 1776). He built Rajbari at Darbhanga and moved the capital to Darbhanga from Bhawara.
  Raja Madho Singh (ruled 1776 to 1808) (died 1808). He was a younger brother of Pratap Singh and succeeded him upon his death. In 1776, he received a grant of land at Dharampur in Purnea district from Shah Alam II, the Mughal Emperor of India. He had a long dispute with the British government over revenue payments and the extent of his rights over the land.
  Maharaja Chhatra Singh Bahadur (ruled 1808 to 1839) (died 1839). He was the second son of Madho Singh and the first in the family to hold the title of Maharaja Bahadur. Chhatra Singh made over his estate and title to his eldest son, Rudra Singh, on the grounds of old age in 1839. He died a few days later after the son's coronation.
  Maharaja Rudra Singh Bahadur (ruled 1839 to 1850) (died 1850). After the death of Chhatra Singh, the younger brothers of Rudra Singh  were involved in a long litigation for succession to the estate. It was ultimately held by the High Court of Calcutta that the ordinary Hindu Law of Succession could not apply in the case and the Raj Darbhanga family would have to follow the family custom or Kulachar''. Rudra Singh, being the eldest son of Chhatra Singh, was declared to be Maharaja of Darbhanga. This permanently settled the issue of succession and thereafter the succession was based upon primogeniture.
  Maharaja Maheshwar Singh Bahadur (ruled 1850 to 1860) (died 1860). He died in October 1860, leaving behind two sons, Lakshmeshwar Singh and Rameshwar Singh, both of whom became Maharajas of Darbhanga.

  Maharaja Lakshmeshwar Singh Bahadur (ruled 1860 to 1898) (born 25 September 1858, died 17 December 1898). He was a philanthropist. His statue (by Edward Onslow Ford) was installed in Calcutta in 1904 at Dalhousie Square as a tribute to him. Lakshmeshwar Singh was only two years old his father's death so Raj Darbhanga was placed under Ward of Court. He was the first Maharaja of Darbhanga to receive a western education, from a British tutor, Chester Macnaghten ( who was later the founding principal of the Rajkumar College, Rajkot ), and took over the reins of Raj Darbhanga on 25 September 1879 after attaining his majority. He devoted himself to public works and was recognised as one of the greatest nobles and philanthropists of India at that time. On 22 June 1897, he was advanced to the rank of Knight Grand Commander of the Most Eminent Order of the Indian Empire.
  Maharaja Rameshwar Singh Bahadur (ruled 1898 to 1929) (born 16 January 1860, died 3 July 1929). He became Maharaja of Darbhanga after the death of his elder brother Lakshmeshwar Singh, who died without issue. He was appointed to the Indian Civil Service in 1878, serving as assistant magistrate successively at Darbhanga, Chhapra, and Bhagalpur. Maharaja died in July 1929, leaving behind two sons , Maharajkumar Kameshwar Singh and Maharajkumar Vishveshwar Singh
  Maharaja Kameshwar Singh Bahadur (ruled 1929 to the independence of India in 1947) (born 28 November 1907, died 8 November 1962). He was member of the Council of State 1933–1946, member of the Constituent Assembly 1947–1952, and the Member of Parliament (Rajya Sabha-Upper House) 1952–1958 and 1960–1962. He was the first person in India to get a bust of Mahatma Gandhi made, by celebrated artist Clare Sheridan, cousin of Winston Churchill. The bust was presented to the viceroy of India, Victor Hope, 2nd Marquess of Linlithgow, to be displayed in Government House (now Rashtrapati Bhawan). This was acknowledged by Gandhi in a letter to Lord Linlithgow in 1940. Gandhi, in an interview during his visit to Bihar in 1947, said that the Maharaja Kameshwar Singh was an extremely good person and like a son to him.

Palaces

Darbhanga has several palaces that were built during the Darbhanga Raj era. They include Nargona Palace, which was constructed after the 1934 Nepal–Bihar earthquake and has since been donated to Lalit Narayan Mithila University, and Lakshmivilas Palace. which was severely damaged in the 1934 earthquake, rebuilt, and later donated to Kameshwar Singh Darbhanga Sanskrit University and Darbhanga Fort.

Darbhanga Raj also had several palaces in other towns in India, including the Rajnagar Palace Complex at Rajnagar, in Madhubani District of Bihar, and Darbhanga House (currently the Loreto Convent Tara Hall school) at Kaithu, Shimla.

Indian Independence Movement
Lakshmeshwar Singh was one of the founders of the Indian National Congress (INC) in 1885. Raj Darbhanga was one of the major donors to the party despite the family maintaining its proximity to the British Raj. During British rule, the INCy wanted to hold their annual convention in Allahabad but they were denied permission by the Government to use any public place for this purpose. The Maharaja of Darbhanga bought an area and allowed Congress to hold their annual convention there. The annual convention of Congress of 1892 was held on 28 December on the grounds of Lowther Castle, purchased by the then Maharaja. The area was leased to the INC by the Maharaja to thwart any attempts by British officials to deny the party a place to hold their annual conventions. National flag hosting was done on the Darbhanga Kila gate by Mithila Student Union after 57 years in 2018.

Mithila society and Maithili language

The Raj Darbhanga royal family was looked upon as the embodiment of Mithila and the Maithili language by people in the region. The incumbent maharaja was hereditary head of Maithil Mahasabha, a writers' organisation, and they played a prominent role in the revival of the language and its literature.

They were very secular families and above religion.Raj established a medical school and hospital that was later known as PMCH where one seat to went to Muhammad umar' son in law dr  Alimuddin of vidyapati nagar who had pattonage of raj pariwar being music maker and musician against 2 seats reserved for Raj pariwar.It shows how raj pariwar of Darbhanga was above religion.They were pioneer in maintaining hindu muslim unity.

Religion
The Maharajas of Darbhanga were devoted to Sanskrit traditions and were supporters of orthodox Hindu practices in both caste and religion. Shiva and Kali were the main deities of the royal family. Even though they were deeply religious, they were also secular in their outlook. The palace area in Darbhanga has three tombs of Muslim saints and a small mosque. The walls of fort at Darbhanga was designed to leave an area so that the mosque is not disturbed. The tomb of a Muslim saint is located next to Anandbagh Palace.

As part of their attempt to reintroduce old Hindu customs such as the study of Vedas and Vedic rites, the Maharaja reintroduced Samavedic study by inviting a few well-versed Samavedins from south India to teach there.

Maharaja Rameshwar Singh established and was general president of Sri Bharat Dharma Mahamadal, a neo-conservative Hindu organisation that sought to make Hindu scriptures available to all castes and women. He was one of the main patrons of Agamanusandhana Samiti, an organisation with the objective of publishing Tantric texts in English and other languages.

Promotion of education

The royal family of Darbhanga played a role in the spread of education in India. Darbhanga Raj was a major donor to Benaras Hindu University, Calcutta University, Allahabad University, Patna University, Kameshwar Singh Darbhanga Sanskrit University, Darbhanga Medical College and Hospital, Lalit Narayan Mithila University, Aligarh Muslim University, and many other educational institutions in India.

Maharaja Rameshwar Singh Bahadur was a major donor and supporter of Pt. Madan Mohan Malviya for starting Banaras Hindu University; he donated Rs. 5,000,000 start-up funds and assisted in the fundraising campaign. Maharaja Kameshwar Singh was also the Pro-Chancellor of Banaras Hindu University.

Maharaja Rameshwar Singh donated Darbhanga House (Navlakha Palace) at Patna to Patna University. The Maharaja played an important role getting Maithili introduced as a subject in Patna University, and in 1920, he donated Rs. 500,000.00 to establish Patna Medical College Hospital, the single highest contributor.

Maharaja Kameshwar Singh donated his ancestral house, Anand Bag Palace, on 30 March 1960, along with a rich library and land surrounding the palace to establish Kameshwar Singh Sanskrit University. Nargona Palace and the Raj Head Office were donated in 1972 to the Government of Bihar. The buildings are now part of Lalit Narayan Mithila University. Raj Darbhanga donated 70,935 books to Lalit Narain Mithila University for its library.

Raj School in Darbhanga was founded by Maharaja Lakshmeshwar Singh Bahadur. This school was established to provide the English medium of education and to introduce modern teaching methods in Mithila. Several other schools were also opened throughout Raj Darbhanga.

Raj Darbhanga was a major donor to Calcutta University, and the central library building of Calcutta University is called the Darbhanga Building.

In 1951, Mithila Snatkottar Shodh Sansthan (the Mithila Post-Graduate Research Institute), located at Kabraghat, was established on the initiative of Dr. Rajendra Prasad, first President of India.

The Maharajas of Darbhanga were the main patrons, trustees, and financiers of Mahakali Pathshala, a school established by Mst. Gangabai in 1839 for promoting education for women. Similarly many colleges like Bareilly College, Bareilly received substantial donations from Maharajas of Darbhanga.

Maharani Rameshwari Bhartiya Chikitsa Vigyan Sansthan at Mohanpur is named after the wife of Maharaja Rameshwar Singh.

Music
Darbhanga became one of the prominent centres of Hindustani classical music from the late 18th century. The kings of Raj Darbhanga were great patrons of music, art, and culture. Several famous musicians were associated with Raj Darbhanga. Prominent amongst them were Ustad Bismillah Khan, Gauhar Jaan, Pandit Ram Chatur Mallik, Pandit Rameshwar Pathak, and Pandit Siya Ram Tiwari. Raj Darbhanga was a main patron of Dhrupad, a vocal style in Hindustani classical music. A major school of Dhrupad today is known as Darbhanga Gharana. Today there are three major gharanas of Dhrupad in India: Dagar Gharana, Mishras of Bettiah Raj (Bettiah Gharana), and the Mallicks of Darbhanga (Darbhanga Gharana).

According to S. M. Ghosh (quoted in 1896) Maharaja Lakshmishwar Singh was a good sitar player.

Ustad Bismillah Khan was a court musician of Raj Darbhanga for several years. He had spent his childhood in Darbhanga.

Gauhar Jaan gave her first performance before the Maharaja of Darbhanga in 1887 and was appointed as court musician. Pandit Rameshwar Pathak, one of the foremost Sitar players of the early 20th century, was court musician in Raj Darbhanga.

Raj Darbhanga supported Murad Ali Khan, brother of Nanhe Khan of Gwalior. Murad Ali Khan was one of the foremost sarod players of his time. Murad Ali Khan is credited with being the first person to use metal strings and metal fingerboard plates on his sarod, which has today become the standard.

Kundan Lal Sehgal was a friend of Raja Bisheshwar Singh, younger brother of Maharaja Kameshwar Singh. Whenever the two met the Bela Palace at Darbhanga witnessed long sessions of conversations and renditions of ghazals and thumris. K. L. Sehgal attended the marriage of Raja Bahadur, and took out his harmonium and sang "Babul Mora Naihar Chhuto Hee Jaye" at the wedding.

Raj Darbhanga had its own symphony orchestra and police band. There was a circular structure in front of Manokamna Temple, which was known as the Band Stand. The band used to play music there in the evening. Today the floor of bandstand is the only part still extant.

Sir kameshwar singh then darbhanga maharaj promoted harmoniummanufacturing through famus firm known as Alam Flute.It was founded in 1885 by Alam who migrated from Azamgarh UP and sttled in samastipur after learning to make harmoniums from kokotta.Harmonium after arrival ftom Germany was made familiar to bihar.Alam gathered carpenters from bejha lagunia a nearby village to samastipur town and trained them how to manufecture harmonium.His son Muhammad Muhammad popularised it and he was leading harmonium player in his  known area and he had patronage of DarbhangaRaj.Samastipuris still prominent place of harmoniummanufacturingabd other mudical instruments.

Public works
 Maharaja Lakshmeshwar Singh Bahadur got schools, dispensaries, and other facilities constructed and maintained them out of his own funds for the benefit of the public. The dispensary at Darbhanga cost £3400, a huge sum at the time.
 Maharaja Lakshmeshwar Singh Bahadur initiated construction of iron bridges constructed on all rivers in the Raj.
 Raj Darbhanga donated 52 bighas of land for the creation and use of the Muzaffarpur Judgeship.
 Raj Darbhanga had several lakes and ponds dug in the region to provide irrigation for farmers and thus help prevent famines.
 The first railway line in north Bihar, between Darbhanga and Bajitpur on the banks of the Ganges opposite Barh, was built in 1874 at the prompting of the Maharaja Lakshmishwar Singh.
 Over 1,500 km of roads were constructed by the early part of the 19th century by Raj Darbhanga. Of this over 300 km was metalled road. This resulted in the expansion of trade as well as greater markets for agricultural produce in the region.
 Many dharamshalas (charitable lodging houses) were constructed such as Ram Mandir and Rani Kotha in Varanasi.
 Homes for destitute people were constructed.
 Kharagpur Lake, a large reservoir, was built on the Man river in Munger District.
 Raj Darbhanga was a pioneer of cross-breeding cattle to improve milk production. A superior milking cow breed called Hansi was introduced by Raj Darbhanga. The cow was a cross between local cows and the Jersey breed.

Sports
Raj Darbhanga actively promoted various sports activities. The Polo Ground in Laheriasarai was a major centre for polo in pre-independence times in Bihar. The winner of a major polo tournament in Calcutta is awarded the Darbhanga Cup.

Raja Bishweshwar Singh was one of the founding members of the All India Football Federation, the prime governing body for football in India. Raja Bahadur, along with Rai Bahadur Jyoti Prasad Singh of Hariharpur Estate, were the Honorary Secretaries of the federation upon its inception in 1935.

The first flight over Mount Everest in took place in 1933. This expedition was organised by military officers, supported by public companies, and hosted by the Maharajah of Darbhanga Kameshwar Singh Bahadur along with the Raja of Banaili.

See also
List of rulers of Mithila
Zamindars of Bihar
List of Brahmin dynasties and states

References

Further reading

Culture of Mithila
Maharajas of Darbhanga
Tourism in Bihar
Kingdoms of Bihar
Zamindari estates
16th-century establishments in Nepal